Le vaisseau fantôme ("The Phantom Ship") is an opera in two acts and three tableaux by Pierre-Louis Dietsch to a French libretto by Paul Foucher and Bénédict-Henry Révoil, based on Captain Marryat's novel The Phantom Ship, Sir Walter Scott's The Pirate, as well as tales by Heinrich Heine, James Fenimore Cooper, and Wilhelm Hauff. It was premiered on 9 November 1842 by the Paris Opera at the Salle Le Peletier and received 12 performances.

Background
Richard Wagner had submitted a scenario, Le hollandais volant (later to become famous as the opera Der fliegende Holländer), to Léon Pillet, Director of the Paris Opera, for a future French language opera by himself. Although Pillet was interested, he determined to contract librettist Paul Foucher and Dietsch to create the work.

Premiere
The sets were designed by Charles-Antoine Cambon and Humanité-René Philastre. The costumes were designed by Paul Lormier. According to Nicole Wild, the eponymous ship only appeared on the poster, and the spectators searched for it in vain.

Roles

Synopsis
Place: Scotland
Time: Indefinite

Act 1
Scene 1: A large hall in the home of Barlow in the Shetland Islands. The curtain rises on an evening soirée.

Scene 2: Village of Shetland, with the sea in the background. On the right side, Barlow's house with front steps.

Act 2
A vast view of Shetland and the point of the island. A monastery on the left. A large boulder and the ship at anchor on the right in the background. A gloomy, turbulent sky with clouds.

Recordings
In 2014 Naïve Records released a recording of the opera conducted by Marc Minkowski, coupled with the original version of Der fliegende Holländer. The cast included Sally Matthews as Minna, Bernhard Richter as Magnus, Eric Cutler as Erik and Russell Braun as Troil.

Gallery

Notes

Bibliography
 Millington, Barry (1992). "Fliegende Holländer, Der", vol. 2, pp. 228–231, in The New Grove Dictionary of Opera, 4 volumes. London: Macmillan. .
 Wild, Nicole (1987). Décors et costumes du XIXe siècle. Tome I. Opéra de Paris, pp. 269–270. Paris: Bibliothèque nationale, Département de la Musique. .

External links
 Libretto (Paris, 1842) at Gallica
 Libretto (Brussels, 1842), at Google Books

1842 operas
French-language operas
Operas
Operas based on novels
Opera world premieres at the Paris Opera
Operas based on works by Walter Scott
Heinrich Heine
James Fenimore Cooper
Adaptations of works by Wilhelm Hauff